Buddy's Circus is a 1934 Warner Bros. Looney Tunes cartoon, directed by Jack King. The short was released on November 8, 1934, and stars Buddy, the second star of the series.

Summary
We come to a balloon, in which float Buddy and several animals, including an elephant, a lion, and a bear. Buddy looks through a spy-glass to see a sign that says "Buddy's Circus will arrive at 2:00 P.M." Checking his watch, Buddy sees that the time is nigh: he releases from his arms a gaggle of stakes, which land perfectly in a circle completed by the sign, and which are hammered into the earth by an octopus, which then is flattened by the landing balloon, which seamlessly morphs into a circus tent. Two men set up walls outside the tent, and one of them begins welcoming patrons to the show.

"Professor" Buddy plays the tusks of his "Musical Elephants" as a xylophone and then pulls their tails to the production of a woodwind sound. Buddy introduces, in verse, the "Ubangi twins", two performers who can play one another as musical instruments; "Oscar the Ubangi-phone," who can play records with his mouth; "Elastiko the India-Rubber Man", whose body can stretch to great lengths and whose skull can take great punishment; "Asbesto the Human Stove", who eats eggs and then, by X-ray, demonstrates his natural ability to cook them within his digestive tract.  But none of this is the "big show," to which Buddy happily welcomes all of his guests.  We come to a two ring circus, where ringmaster Buddy precedes a kangaroo (or two) with a trumpet, and  lions jump through smoke rings blown by a reclining clown. One performer subjects himself to being lifted by his teeth with a rope, which reveals them to be dentures, which come out of his mouth and the performer falls to the ground. A baby enjoys the show whilst munching Cracker Jack until he drops the box out of which he is eating into the stands. Endeavoring to retrieve the box, the child enters the underside of the seats and swings from patron's leg to patron's leg until he finds the ground, where he reaches for his found Cracker Jack box, all of whose spilled contents then are absorbed by a playful elephant, which then takes a merry baby onto its trunk.

Soon we see the baby behind the elephant's ear. The child is thrust into a dance routine with the elephant and another directly behind it. The baby sits on a teeter-totter on the stage and eats his Cracker Jack. A performer, who not a moment before hung from the nose rings of two trapeze artists, breaks the rings of those same and falls onto the upper side of the see-saw on whose lower side sits the small child: up goes the baby, into the air and onto the platform of a trapeze artist about to jump. The child grabs the ankles of the performer: another trapezist leaps from an opposite platform and catches, not the legs of his partner, but the baby thereon hanging. The trapeze artists swing such that the performer hanging onto the baby is stuck stretching the fabric of the child's garment: the man knocks down four tightrope walkers stacked on top of one another, and then falls on account of the garment breaking under the strain, and lands in the large brass horn of a band member, the which instrument's playing propels the performer upward, back to the baby, from whom he swiftly falls.

Amidst all this, the child's mother finally realizes that her baby is missing and on the grounds of the circus: Buddy, seeing that he must do something, climbs rapidly up a pole, and is followed by the boy's mother. Our Hero walks upon a net (presumably placed to catch trapeze artists), makes a lasso with a rope, and throws it to bring down the baby: the child resists, but comes down, pulling off the outer-clothing of the performer on whose legs he had been hanging. The baby lands in the net, but the force of his fall sends Buddy and the mother into the air; the two catch onto the same performer, and are followed by the baby; the trapezist swings, causing the child to have to catch on to the other trapeze bar, and the infant is followed by Buddy and the mother, who, as a result, are hanging in air by the legs of the baby. A bicyclist rides by on the tightrope, but is knocked off by the low-hanging Buddy and the baby's mother, who ride, Buddy on the mother's shoulders, in pursuit of the baby, still hanging by the trapeze. But the bicycle crashes, and Buddy, the baby, and his mother are sent through the fabric of the tent: the baby lands in some water, Buddy and the lady the neck of a giraffe, down which they slide in order to safely reach the ground. Mother calls for her child, Buddy futilely searches; a sobbing mother is then comforted by Buddy. Just then, the water into which the baby fell is revealed to be the home of a hippopotamus, in whose mouth the baby safely and happily sits. The mother takes her child from an obliging hippo, and the reunited two dance, in a circle, with Buddy.

Release date discrepancy
The dating in this article follows the chronology given in the article Looney Tunes and Merrie Melodies filmography (1929–1939). As noted above, the chronological release list given as an appendix in Leonard Maltin's Of Mice and Magic gives as the release date 8 November 1933. The same list, of course, gives a similarly conflicting order of release for Buddy's shorts: according to Maltin's book, the order, after Buddy's Bearcats and before Buddy of the Legion is Buddy the Detective, followed by Buddy the Woodsman, Buddy's Circus, Viva Buddy, Buddy's Adventures, Buddy the Dentist, Buddy's Pony Express, and Buddy's Theatre, after which Wikipedia and Maltin's book agree on the order and dates of release.

Home media
Buddy's Circus is featured on disc three of the Looney Tunes Golden Collection: Volume 6. Along with Buddy's Day Out and Buddy's Beer Garden, it is one of only three Buddy cartoons released on DVD.

References

External links
 

1934 films
1934 animated films
1930s American animated films
1930s animated short films
American black-and-white films
Circus films
Films scored by Norman Spencer (composer)
Films directed by Jack King
Buddy (Looney Tunes) films
Looney Tunes shorts